Robert J. Gillis (June 21, 1926 – April 19, 2009) was an American football coach born in Bellows Falls, Vermont. He studied at S. from Adrian College in Adrian, Michigan, MA at the University of Michigan and PhD at Springfield College.   Gillis was the head football coach at Adrian College.  He held that position for three seasons, from 1956 until 1958.  His coaching record at Adrian was 9–15. He was a resident of Wolfeboro, New Hampshire.  Gillis moved up from coaching football to being the athletic director at Adrian College for many years.  With the retirement of long time college president, John Dawson, Gillis became the dean of students for approximately four years, until his retirement in 1986.

Head coaching record

References

1926 births
2009 deaths
Coaches of American football from New Hampshire
Coaches of American football from Vermont
Adrian Bulldogs football coaches
People from Bellows Falls, Vermont
People from Wolfeboro, New Hampshire
Sportspeople from Carroll County, New Hampshire